HMS Ariel was an  built in 1911, which served during the First World War and sank in 1918 after striking a mine. Named after Shakespeare's "airy spirit", or the biblical spirit of the same name, she was the tenth and last ship of the name to serve in the Royal Navy.

Construction
With her sister, Acheron, she was a "Thornycroft special", and as such was slightly longer and more powerful than the standard destroyer of her class. Ariel was laid down at the Woolston yard of John I. Thornycroft & Company, and launched on 26 September 1911.

Pennant numbers

Career
As part of the First Destroyer Flotilla, she was attached to the Grand Fleet in August 1914, and then to the Third Battle Squadron from the spring of 1916. Once converted to a minelayer in 1917, she became part of the 20th Flotilla.

Establishing the Heligoland Bight patrol
On 5 August 1914, Ariel towed submarine  to Terschelling. They were in company with cruiser  and submarine . After releasing the tow, the two submarines conducted the first Heligoland Bight patrol of the war.

Battle of Heligoland Bight
As part of the Harwich Force, the First Destroyer Flotilla took part in the Battle of Heligoland Bight on 28 August. Ariel — under Commander Dashwood Moir — shared in the prize money for the battle.

Battle of Dogger Bank
Aurora was the first British ship to engage the German ships as she encountered Hipper's screening vessels at the Dogger Bank at 07:05.

Sinking of U-12

At 10:10, Attack sighted  and opened fire. She turned to ram, sighting the conning tower under the water in the final moments before she struck the submarine at a fine angle. Within two minutes, the submarine had returned to the surface so that the crew could escape, but they found the conning tower hatch jammed, and most of the survivors managed their escape via the other hatches. The destroyers opened fire as the submarine lay on the surface, killing and injuring some of the escaping sailors. At 10:30, U-12 sank approximately in position , and the destroyers picked up 10 survivors; 19 lives had been lost. The damage to Ariels bow was so serious that she had to be towed into port.

Battle of Jutland

Sinking of UC-19
On 6 December 1916,  sank the Russian sailing ship Ans (Later claimed to have been sunk by ). The P&O vessel Kashmir sent out a radio warning, and later the same day Ariels lookouts spotted the conning tower of a submarine. A depth charge was dropped in the position of the submarine, but it failed to explode.

Conversion to minelayer
In 1917, the Acheron-class destroyers , Sandfly and Ariel were converted to minelaying destroyers, capable of carrying 40 mines. Ariel served with the 20th Flotilla, and operated out of Immingham.

Minelaying operations in the Heligoland Bight
The provision of converted minelaying destroyers and the availability of reliable H2-pattern mines allowed the greatest allied minelaying operation of the First World War — the attempt to close Heligoland Bight to German ships and submarines. Ariel — with her sisters — was employed on this work until the end of the war. All three vessels were sunk and 72 prisoners were captured.

Loss
On 2 August, while conducting minelaying in the western end of the Heligoland Bight, the V-class destroyer  sank after striking a German mine. In attempting to exit the minefield, Ariel lost her bow and sank in less than an hour. 49 people died, including her commanding officer, Lieutenant Frank A Rothera.

References

External links 

 
 Battle of Jutland Crew Lists Project - HMS Ariel Crew List

 

Acheron-class destroyers of the Royal Navy
Ships built in Southampton
1911 ships
World War I destroyers of the United Kingdom
Maritime incidents in 1918
World War I shipwrecks in the North Sea
Ships sunk by mines
Ships built by John I. Thornycroft & Company